The 2015 World Pool Masters, also known as World Pool Masters XXIII, was a nine-ball pool tournament that took place in Manchester, England, between 14–16 August 2015. It was the 23rd edition of the invitational tournament organised by Matchroom Sport.

The event was won by Shane Van Boening, who defeated Darren Appleton in the final 8–2, to win his second Pool Masters title. This was Van Boening's second straight championship, having won the title before in 2014.

Event prize money

Tournament bracket

References

External links

2015
World Pool Masters
World Pool Masters
World Pool Masters
Sports competitions in Manchester
World Pool Masters